Ugh, Those Feels Again (stylized as - Ugh, those feels again) is the second studio album by Swedish singer Snoh Aalegra. It was released on 16 August 2019 through ARTium.

Music
Ugh, Those Feels Again is considered to be a sequel to Feels, similar in mood and theme. The album was described as "cinematic soul" by Aalegra and is predominantly an R&B album with elements of soul, and rap.

Release and promotion
Ugh, Those Feels Again was released for Digital download and streaming on 16 August 2019 by ARTium Recordings. On 3 February 2020, a standard and limited edition of the album was released on vinyl.

Critical reception

Upon its release, Ugh, Those Feels Again received generally positive reviews from most music critics. At Metacritic, which assigns a weighted mean rating out of 100 to reviews from music critics, the album received an aggregate score of 73.

Track listing

Charts

Release history

References

2019 albums
Snoh Aalegra albums